The Democratic Republic of the Congo is a multilingual country where an estimated total of 242 languages are spoken. Ethnologue lists 215 living languages. The official language, inherited from the colonial period, is French. Four other languages, three of them indigenous, have the status of national language: Kikongo, Lingala, Swahili and Tshiluba.

51% of the total population speaks French and 74% are using French as a lingua franca.

When the country was a Belgian colony, it had already instituted teaching and use of the four national languages in primary schools, making it one of the few African nations to have had literacy in local languages during the European colonial period. French remains the official language in the Congolese government and is spoken by half of the population.

French 

French is the official language of the country since its colonial period under Belgian rule. Therefore, the variety of French used in the DRC has many similarities with Belgian French. French has been maintained as the official language since the time of independence because it is widely spoken in the capital of the country-Kinshasa,  it belongs to none of the indigenous ethnic groups and eases communication between them as well as with the rest of the Francophonie, which includes many African countries. According to a 2018 OIF report, 42.5 million Congolese people (50.6% of the population) can read and write in French. In the capital city Kinshasa, 67% of the population can read and write French, and 68.5% can speak and understand it. The Democratic Republic of the Congo currently has the largest population of any country with French as its official language.

According to a 2021 survey, French was the most spoken language in the country: a total of 74% of Congolese (79% of men, and 68% of women) reported using French as a language of communication.

Kikongo ya leta 
The constitution says Kikongo is one of the national languages, but in fact it is a Kikongo-based creole, Kituba (Kikongo ya Leta "Kikongo of the government", Leta being derived from French l'État "the State") that is used in the constitution and by the administration in the provinces of Bas-Congo (which is inhabited by the Bakongo), Kwango, and Kwilu. Kituba has become a vehicular language in many urban centres including Kikwit, Bandundu, Matadi, Boma and Muanda.

Lingala 
Lingala is a language which gained its modern form in the colonial period, with the push of missionaries to standardize and teach a local lingua franca. It was originally spoken in the upper Congo river area but rapidly spread to the middle Congo area and eventually became the major Bantu language in Kinshasa.

Lingala was made the official language of the army under Mobutu, but since the rebellions, the army has also used Swahili in the east. With the transition period and the consolidation of different armed groups into the Congolese Army, the linguistic policy has returned to its previous form and Lingala is again the official language of the Army.

A 2021 survey found that Lingala was the second-most spoken language in the country, used by 59% of the population (62% of men and 56% of women).

Swahili 
Swahili is the most widespread lingua franca spoken in Eastern Equatorial Africa. Many variations of Swahili are spoken in the country but the major one is Kingwana, sometimes called Copperbelt Swahili, especially in the Katanga area.

Tshiluba 
The constitution does not specify which of the two major variations of Tshiluba is the national language. Luba-Kasai is spoken in the East Kasai Region (Luba people) and Luba-Lulua is used in the West Kasai Region among the Bena Lulua people. Luba-Kasai seems to be the language used by the administration. A related language, known as Luba-Katanga, is spoken in Katanga Province.

Sign languages 
There are 12 deaf institutions in the country, and most teach French Sign Language or variations. American Sign Language is also practiced in the country.

Other languages 
The most notable other languages of the Democratic Republic of the Congo are Mashi, Mongo, Lunda, Kilega, Tetela, Chokwe, Budza, Ngbandi, Lendu, Mangbetu, Yombe, Nande, Ngbaka, Zande, Lugbara and Komo. Considerable numbers of people in eastern Congo who came from Rwanda in either pre-colonial or recent times speak Kinyarwanda.

As of 2010 the government decided to include Portuguese as an optional language at schools as a response to Brazil's increasing influence on the continent, and of the growing and considerable Angolan and Mozambican immigrant communities.

Among the various forms of slang spoken in the Congo, Indubil has been noted since around the 1960s and continues to evolve today.

References

External links 

 Tola Akindipe, Veronica Tshiama & Francisco Yamba, Largest online resource to learn Tshiluba (Mofeko)
Linguistic map of the Democratic Republic of the Congo  from Muturzikin.com
 Ethnologue.com: Ethnologue report for the Democratic Republic of the Congo
 PanAfrican L10n: Democratic Republic of Congo, languages and software localization
  Linguistic situation in RDC
  New Technologies and languages of both Congos 
  ONG Éveil du Congo, NGO working in localization and translations in Congolese national languages

Further reading